Francesco Lepre (born 27 April 1975) is an Italian judoka.

Achievements

References

External links
 
 

1975 births
Living people
Italian male judoka
Judoka at the 2000 Summer Olympics
Judoka at the 2004 Summer Olympics
Olympic judoka of Italy
Universiade medalists in judo
Mediterranean Games bronze medalists for Italy
Mediterranean Games medalists in judo
Competitors at the 2005 Mediterranean Games
Universiade bronze medalists for Italy
21st-century Italian people